Prateek Baid is an Indian model, actor, automobile engineer and beauty pageant titleholder. He hails from the city of Bikaner in the Indian state of Rajasthan.

Biography
Prateek Baid was born on 15 September 1991 in Bikaner, a city in Rajasthan. He went to Central Academy Bikaner School. He graduated with a degree in mechanical engineering from Manda institute of technology College Bikaner. He won the Glam Icon 2015 held on 22 November 2015 at Kurla, Mumbai organized by Phoenix Market City Mumbai. He made his television debut with Maharakshak: Devi aired on Zee TV. Later in 2016 he won Rubaru Mr. India 2016 contest held on 24 April 2016 at Anya Hotel in Gurugram (previously Gurgaon) and represented India at Mister Global 2016 contest held at Central Plaza in Chiang Mai, Thailand and won the Best  Model award and placed as the Top 15 semi-finalist.

Awards and honours
•	Below is the list of awards won by Prateek Baid.

See also
Rohit Khandelwal
Puneet Beniwal

References

External links
Prateek Baid: Mister Global India 2016
Mister Global website
Rubaru Mister India 2016 winners
Rubaru Mister India 2016 winners (Photos)
Mister Global 2016 contestants in swimwear
Asian contenders in Mr Global 2016
Mister Global - Pageantopolis
Prateek Baid official facebook

Living people
1991 births
Indian male models
Male actors from Rajasthan
Indian male television actors
Indian beauty pageant winners
Male beauty pageant winners
Beauty pageant contestants from India
People from Bikaner